Baby Teeth is the first studio album by the Screaming Females.  The band recorded it themselves and also self-released it on CD in 2006 and vinyl in early 2007.

Track listing

Personnel 

 Marissa Paternoster – vocals, guitar
 Jarrett Dougherty – drums
 Mike "King Mike" Abbate – bass

References

Screaming Females albums
Don Giovanni Records albums
2007 debut albums